Takayuki Yamaguchi may refer to:

Takayuki Yamaguchi (footballer), Japanese footballer
Takayuki Yamaguchi (artist) (born 1966), Japanese manga artist
Takayuki Yamaguchi (voice actor), Japanese voice actor